Inborn errors of carbohydrate metabolism are inborn error of metabolism that affect the catabolism and anabolism of carbohydrates.

An example is lactose intolerance.

Carbohydrates account for a major portion of the human diet.  These carbohydrates are composed of three principal monosaccharides: glucose, fructose and galactose; in addition glycogen is the storage form of carbohydrates in humans. The failure to effectively use these molecules accounts for the majority of the inborn errors of human carbohydrates metabolism.

By Carbohydrate

Glycogen and Glucose

Glycogen storage diseases are enzyme deficiencies which impair glycogen synthesis, glycogen degradation or glycolysis. The two organs most commonly affected are the liver and the skeletal muscle. Glycogen storage diseases that affect the liver typically cause hepatomegaly and hypoglycemia; those that affect skeletal muscle cause exercise intolerance, progressive weakness and cramping.

Glucose-6-phosphate isomerase deficiency affects step 2 of glycolysis. Triosephosphate isomerase deficiency affects step 5 of glycolysis. Phosphoglycerate kinase deficiency affects step 7 of glycolysis. Pyruvate kinase deficiency affects the 10th and last step of glycolysis.

Glucose-6-phosphate dehydrogenase deficiency affects the degradation of glucose in the pentose phosphate pathway, which is especially important in red blood cells.

For further information on inborn errors of glucose metabolism and inborn errors of glycogen metabolism see below.

Lactose
 
Lactose is a disaccharide sugar composed of galactose and glucose that is found in milk. Lactose can not be absorbed by the intestine and needs to be split in the small intestine into galactose and glucose by the enzyme called lactase; unabsorbed lactose can cause abdominal pain, bloating, diarrhea, gas, and nausea.

In most mammals, production of lactase diminishes after infants are weaned from maternal milk. However, 5% to 90% of the human population possess an advantageous autosomal mutation in which lactase production persists after infancy. The geographic distribution of lactase persistence is concordant with areas of high milk intake. Lactase non-persistence is common in tropical and subtropical countries. Individuals with lactase non-persistency may experience nausea, bloating and diarrhea after ingesting dairy.

Galactose
Galactosemia, the inability to metabolize galactose in liver cells, is the most common monogenic disorder of carbohydrate metabolism, affecting 1 in every 55,000 newborns. When galactose in the body is not broken down, it accumulates in tissues. The most common signs are failure to thrive, hepatic insufficiency, cataracts and developmental delay. Long term disabilities include poor growth, mental retardation, and ovarian failure in females.

Galactosemia is caused by mutations in the gene that makes the enzyme galactose-1-phosphate uridylyltransferase.  Approximately 70% of galactosemia-causing alleles have a single missense mutation in exon 6.  A milder form of galactosemia, called Galactokinase deficiency, is caused a lack of the enzyme uridine diphosphate galactose-4-epimerase which breaks down a byproduct of galactose. This type of is associated with cataracts, but does not cause growth failure, mental retardation, or hepatic disease.  Dietary reduction of galactose is also the treatment but not as severe as in patients with classical galactosemia.  This deficiency can be systemic or limited to red blood cells and leukocytes.

Screening is performed by measuring GAL-1-P urydil transferase activity.  Early identification affords prompt treatment, which consists largely of eliminating dietary galactose.

Fructose
Fructose malabsorption is a digestive disorder in which absorption of fructose is impaired by deficient fructose carriers in the small intestine's enterocytes.

Three autosomal recessive disorders impair fructose metabolism in liver cells. The most common is caused by mutations in the gene encoding hepatic fructokinase, an enzyme that catalyzes the first step in the metabolism of dietary fructose. Inactivation of the hepatic fructokinase results in asymptomatic fructosuria.

Hereditary fructose intolerance (HFI) results in poor feeding, failure to thrive, chronic liver disease and chronic kidney disease, and death. HFI is caused by a deficiency of fructose 1,6-biphosphate aldolase in the liver, kidney cortex and small intestine. Infants and adults are asymptomatic unless they ingest fructose or sucrose.

Deficiency of hepatic fructose 1,6-biphosphate (FBPase) causes impaired gluconeogenesis, hypoglycemia and severe metabolic acidemia. If patients are adequately supported beyond childhood, growth and development appear to be normal.

Essential fructosuria is a clinically benign condition characterized by the incomplete metabolism of fructose in the liver, leading to its excretion in urine.

By affected system

Glucose metabolism

Glycolysis 

The metabolic pathway glycolysis is used by cells to break down carbohydrates like glucose (and various other simple sugars) in order to extract energy from them. During glycolysis ATP, NADH (both an energy transport form used inside cells) as well as pyruvate are produced.

Glycolysis is taking place in the cytosol where, under anaerobic conditions, pyruvate is converted to lactate. Under aerobic conditions, the pyruvate is transported from the cytosol to the mitochondrion, where further energy can be extracted through the citric acid cycle (CAC) (see below, c.f. bioenergetic systems).

The liver can also create glucose (gluconeogenesis, see below); during times of low carbohydrate supply from the digestive system, the liver creates glucose and supplies it to other organs. Most enzymes of glycolysis also participate in gluconeogenesis, as it is mostly the reverse metabolic pathway of glycolysis; a deficiency of these liver enzymes will therefore impact both glycolysis and gluconeogenesis. (Note: gluconeogenesis is taking place only in the liver and not in other cells like e.g. muscle cells.)

Related to glycolysis 
The pyruvate created by glycolysis (in the cytosol) is transported (together with a proton) to the mitochondrion for further energy extraction.

Under anaerobic conditions (without the use of oxygen) most if not all of the pyruvate is converted to lactate (furthermore producing NADH at the same time).

Under aerobic conditions (with the use of oxygen) only part of the pyruvate is converted to lactate; the pyruvate not converted feeds the citric acid cycle (CAC); both via pyruvate dehydrogenase (PDC, with Acetyl-CoA as intermediate) and via pyruvate decarboxylation - this will create further ATP and NADH for the cell's use.

The pentose phosphate pathway (HMP Shunt) is connected to the glycolysis pathway, and can convert substrates to and from the glycolysis pathway. It generates NADPH and pentoses (5-carbon sugars) as well as ribose 5-phosphate, a precursor for the synthesis of nucleotides. While the pentose phosphate pathway does involve oxidation of glucose, its primary role is anabolic rather than catabolic. The pathway is especially important in red blood cells (erythrocytes).

Transport proteins move substrates through cellular membranes. A glucose transporter (GLUT) protein is needed to assist glucose into (and in the liver and kidneys, also out of) the cell. De Vivo disease (GLUT1 deficiency) is a deficiency of GLUT1, which is needed to transport glucose across the blood-brain barrier. Fanconi-Bickel syndrome (GLUT2 deficiency, formally known as GSD-XI) is a deficiency of GLUT2, which is needed for the transport of glucose between liver and blood.

Mitochondrial pyruvate carrier deficiency (MPYCD) is a metabolic disorder, in which the transport of pyruvate from the cytosol to the mitochondria is affected (gene BRP44L/MPC1); the deficiency is characterized by delayed psychomotor development and lactic acidosis with a normal lactate/pyruvate ratio resulting from impaired mitochondrial pyruvate oxidation.

(See also bioenergetic systems.)

Gluconeogenesis

Glycogen metabolism

Glycogenesis 

Glycogenesis is the metabolic pathway in which glycogen is created. Glycogen, which consists of branched long chains made out of the simple sugar glucose, is an energy storage form for carbohydrates in many human cells; this is most important in liver, muscle and certain brain cells.

The monosaccharide glucose-6-phosphate (G-6-P) is typically the input substance for glycogenesis. G-6-P is most commonly created from glucose by the action of the enzymes glucokinase (see glycolysis step 1) or hexokinase.

Through the action of several enzymes glycogen is built up:
 G-6-P is converted into glucose-1-phosphate (G-1-P) by the action of phosphoglucomutase (PGM), passing through the obligatory intermediate glucose-1,6-bisphosphate.
 G-1-P is converted into UDP-glucose by the action of the enzyme UDP-glucose pyrophosphorylase (UGP).
 The enzyme glycogenin (GYG) is needed to create initial short glycogen chains, which are lengthened and branched by the other enzymes of glycogenesis.
 Once eight glucose have been added to the glycogen chain, then glycogen synthase (GYS) can bind to the growing glycogen chain and add UDP-glucose to lengthen the glucogen chain.
 Branches are made by glycogen branching enzyme (GBE), which transfers the end of the chain onto an earlier part, forming branches; these grow further grow by addition of more units.

On an alternative metabolic pathway the simple sugar galactose (Gal, which is typically derived from lactose) is converted by the enzyme galactokinase (GALK) to galactose-1-phosphate (Gal-1-P), which in turn is converted by the enzyme galactose-1-phosphate uridylyltransferase (GALT) to glucose-1-phosphate (G-1-P), which can also serve as input for glycogenesis – this bypasses the first step of glycogenesis (the enzyme phosphoglucomutase PGM).

Errors in glycogenesis can have different consequences on a cellular level:
 Too little glycogen is produced, e.g. in GSD 0
 The glycogen is badly formed and inaccessible, typically accumulating in the affected cells (e.g. polyglucosan bodies).
Depending on the affected cells and the extent of the deficiency, a wide range of symptoms and severities are the result.

Glycogenolysis 

To access the energy stored as glycogen, cells use the metabolic pathway glycogenolysis (glycogen breakdown); this produces the simple sugar glucose-6-phosphate (G-6-P), from which cells can extract energy or build other substances (e.g. riboses).

G-6-P (which is also produced from glucose) acts as an input substance for:
 Glycolysis (see above)
 The Pentose phosphate pathway (PPP)
(See also bioenergetic systems.)

An alternative to glycolysis is the Pentose phosphate pathway (PPP): Depending on cellular conditions the PPP can produce NADPH (another energy transport form in the cell) or synthesize riboses (important for substances based on ribose like e.g. RNA) - the PPP is for example important in red blood cells.

If glycogenolysis is taking place in the liver, G-6-P can be converted to glucose by the enzyme glucose 6-phosphatase (G6Pase); the glucose produced in the liver is then released to the bloodstream for use in other organs. Muscle cells in contrast do not have the enzyme glucose 6-phosphatase, so they cannot share their glycogen stores with the rest of the body.

In addition to glycogen breakdown with the glycogen debranching enzyme and the glycogen phosphorylase enzyme, cells also use the enzyme acid alpha-glucosidase in lysosomes to degrade glycogen.

A deficiency of an involved enzyme results in:
 Accumulation of glycogen in the cells
 Lack of cellular energy negatively affects the involved organs
Myophosphorylase (muscle glycogen phosphorylase) comes in two forms: form 'a' is phosphorylated by phosphorylase kinase, form 'b' is not phosphorylated. Form 'a' is de-phosphorylated into form 'b' by the enzyme phosphoprotein phosphatase, which is activated by elevated insulin. 

Both forms 'a' and 'b' of myophosphorylase have two conformational states: active (R or relaxed) and inactive (T or tense). When either form 'a' or 'b' are in the active state, then the enzyme converts glycogen into glucose-1-phosphate. Myophosphorylase-b is allosterically activated by elevated AMP within the cell, and allosterically inactivated by elevated ATP and/or glucose-6-phosphate. Myophosphorylase-a is active, unless allosterically inactivated by elevated glucose within the cell. In this way, myophosphorylase-a is the more active of the two forms as it will continue to convert glycogen into glucose-1-phosphate even with high levels of glycogen-6-phosphate. (See Glycogen phosphorylase§Regulation).

Related to glycogenolysis 

Mutations in the PRKAG2 gene have been traced to fatal congenital nonlysosomal cardiac glycogenosis; PRKAG2 is a noncatalytic gamma subunit of AMP-activated protein kinase (AMPK), which affects the release of G-1-P by phosphorylase kinase during nonlysosomal glycogenolysis.

References

External links

 
Diabetes